The greater bamboo bat (Tylonycteris robustula) is a species of vesper bat in the family Vespertilionidae. It is found in Cambodia, China, India, Indonesia, Laos, Malaysia, Myanmar, the Philippines, Singapore and Thailand.

It has two subspecies:
 Tylonycteris robustula malayana
 Tylonycteris robustula robustula

References

 China's Tiny Bats By Libiao Zhang in Volume 6, Number 9 - September 2008 issue of "Bat Conservation Times".

Tylonycteris
Taxa named by Oldfield Thomas
Mammals described in 1915
Bats of Southeast Asia
Bats of Indonesia
Bats of Malaysia
Mammals of Brunei
Mammals of China
Mammals of India
Mammals of Cambodia
Mammals of Singapore
Mammals of Myanmar
Mammals of Thailand
Mammals of the Philippines
Mammals of Timor
Mammals of Vietnam
Taxonomy articles created by Polbot